Haddiscoe is a village and civil parish in the South Norfolk district of Norfolk, England, about  southeast of Norwich.

The 2011 Census recorded its population as 487 people in 210 households.

Toponym
The Domesday Book of 1086 records the toponym as Hadescou. An entry for 1208 in the feet of fines and one for 1236 in the Book of Fees each record it as Hadesco. A Close Roll dated 1253 records it as Haddesco.

The toponym is derived from Old Norse. "Hadd" was someone's name, and the second part of the word is derived from the Norse word skōgr meaning "wood", so the place was "Hadd's wood".

Churches
The local church in the village is dedicated to St. Mary and was originally constructed in the 15th century. The oldest part of the Church of England parish church of St Mary is the 11th-century west tower. St Mary's is one of 124 round-tower churches in Norfolk. Inside the church are 14th-century murals including one of St Christopher carrying Jesus Christ. Jan Pier Pier, a 16th-century Dutch immigrant and creator of some of the dykes surrounding the village, is buried in the nave. St Mary's is a Grade I listed building.

In Thorpe-next-Haddiscoe is the Church of England parish church of St Matthias. It too has an 11th-century round tower. Its nave has a thatched roof, and its chancel was rebuilt in brick in 1838. St Matthias' is a Grade I listed building.

Economic and social history

Haddiscoe was in Clavering hundred.

Haddiscoe was the site of Norfolk's only Knights Templar preceptory. It was dissolved in the 14th century.

The Haddiscoe Hoard, the largest hoard of English Civil War coins found in Norfolk to date, was found on 17 July 2003 by a workman on a flood defence scheme.

Toft Monks mill is a disused windpump that used to drain the marshes into the River Waveney.

The Haddiscoe Cut (New Cut), a canal linking the River Waveney and River Yare, was opened in 1833. It joins the River Waveney in the parish near Haddiscoe railway station. The cut now forms part of the parish boundary.

Under the Poor Law Amendment Act 1834 Haddiscoe was in the Loddon and Clavering Union.

It passes through Haddiscoe parish, partly alongside the Haddiscoe Cut. The original Haddiscoe railway station was opened to serve it.

In 1862 the Norfolk Railway became part of the Great Eastern Railway, which in 1904 replaced the original Haddiscoe railway station with the present one.

The landscape painter Sir John Arnesby Brown (1866–1955) lived in Haddiscoe and is buried in St Mary's parish churchyard.

A stray V-1 flying bomb fell in Haddiscoe in the Second World War.

References

Bibliography

External links

Haddiscoe – community website
St Mary's on the European Round Tower Churches Website
St Matthias on the European Round Tower Churches Website

.

Coin Hoard Article

Villages in Norfolk
Civil parishes in Norfolk